The Weeds Act 1959 (7 & 8 Eliz. II c. 54) is a Consolidation Act of the Parliament of the United Kingdom. Section 1(1) states: "Where the Minister of Agriculture, Fisheries and Food (in this Act referred to as " the Minister ") is satisfied that there are injurious weeds to which this Act applies growing upon any land he may serve upon the occupier of the land a notice in writing requiring him, within the time specified in the notice, to take such action as may be necessary to prevent the weeds from spreading." It received Royal Assent on 16 July 1959.

The Act preserved powers contained in the Corn Production Acts (Repeal) Act 1921 (11 & 12 Geo. 5. c,48), but which were originally inserted into the Corn Production Act 1917 (7 & 8 Geo. V, c. 46) by the Agriculture Act 1920 (10 & 11 Geo. V c. 76).

The Act confers a permissive power, allowing, but not requiring the Minister to make orders (or take any other action).

It does not make controlling the plants listed compulsory for landowners or occupiers. It does not prohibit anyone from growing them, and it does not make possession of any of those plants a criminal offence.

Species referred to in the Weeds Act 1959

Broad Leaved Dock

The Broad Leaved Dock is a resilient and common perennial plant found in grasslands throughout the United Kingdom. Unaffected by regular climatic variations and all but the most acidic soils, the Broad Leaved Dock can produce around 60,000 seeds a year and flowers from June to October. The seeds can survive for up to 50 years in soil due to a 'chemical that inhibits microbial decay'.

Curled Dock

The Curled Dock is found mostly in meadowland, wasteland, sand dunes, and dry soils. The Curled Dock can be annual, biennial, or perennial, and can produce 3000 to 4000 seeds per plant. Although said to contribute to animal wellbeing by providing nutrients which would otherwise be absent, it also contains oxalic acid which could be damaging to stock.

Creeping Thistle

The Creeping Thistle is a common resilient perennial plant found in grasslands throughout the United Kingdom. Characterised by spined lobed leaves, it stands up to one metre high and blooms with light purple flowers between July and September. Its root system is very deep, extending up to three metres underground and six metres sideways; as such, it is very hard to remove from an affected area. It competes fiercely with other plants or crops and can release a natural biocide into the soil to inhibit growth of other species.

Ragwort

The Common Ragwort is a biennial yellow angiosperm which can grow to 30–100 cm high. Prolific in seed distribution, a ragwort plant can produce around  30,000 to 120,000 seeds. Toxic to livestock it contains several kinds of Pyrrolizidine alkaloid which can, if the dose is high enough, cause liver damage.

Spear Thistle

The Spear Thistle is an annual or biennial plant which forms dark purple or reddish flowers above dark green spiked leaves. A plant found in pastoral land and along roads, it is easily spread by vehicles as they pass by.

References

External links
 Revised Statute of legislation
 

Environmental law in the United Kingdom
United Kingdom Acts of Parliament 1959
Agriculture legislation in the United Kingdom